The Outpost is a science fiction novel by American writer Mike Resnick, first published as hardback by Tor Books in May 2001, followed by paperback edition in August 2002. It is a satirical anthology centered on a tavern called the Outpost on the planet Henry II at the edge of the galaxy, in the neutral territory known as the Inner Frontier where fighting is forbidden. It attracts legendary characters who, while drinking and relaxing, share stories of their lives.

Summary
The novel is divided into 3 sections: Legend, Fact, and History. In Legend, the characters tell stories of what they were doing before they arrived and about people they met and things they did. The storytelling is interrupted by an alien invasion of the system, to which the heroes react. The History section sees everyone gathered back at the Outpost to share their stories and find out the fates of the others.

Major themes
Tall tales in the nature of Paul Bunyan and Pecos Bill, but set in the Wild West of the future.
Religion in the form of monotheism and polytheism.
Discussion of history as a set of facts vs. perceptions.

Stories told
Catastrophe Baker and the Dragon Queen
The Last Landship (Hellfire Carson)
The Greatest Painting of All Time (Little Mike)
The Short, Star-Crossed Career of Magic Adbul-Jordan (Big Red)
When Iron-Arm McPherson Took the Mound (Big Red)
The Night Bet-a-World O'Grady Met High-Stakes Eddie
Catastrophe Baker and the Siren of Silverstrike

Characters
Tomahawk (Thomas Aloysius Hawke) - Owner of The Outpost
Reggie - Robot bartender
Catastrophe Baker - Living legend
Hurricane Smith - hero with a weakness for alien females
Three-Gun Max - Mutant gunfighter with 3 arms
Big Red - Former professional star athlete (basketball, baseball, murderball)
Nicodemus Mayflower - 
Bet-a-World O'Grady - Infamous gambler
Sinderella - 
Little Mike Picasso (Michelangelo Gauguin Rembrandt van Gogh Rockwell Picasso (formerly Montgomery Quiggle))- Famous unknown artist
Sahara Del Rio - Alien (Borovite)
Reverend Billy Karma - 
Einstein - Deaf, blind, mute supragenius
Argyle - Alien with color-changing skin, former accountant
Gravedigger Gaines - Retired bounty hunter
Willie the Bard - Historian and record-keeper for the Outpost
Hellfire Van Winkle - (formerly Hellfire Carson) 5,000 year old former big-game hunter and safari guide
Achmed of Alphar - 
Earth Mother - Retired madam
Sitting Horse & Crazy Bull- Aliens (Velitas IV) who become members of the Great Sioux Nation

Notes and references

2001 American novels
2001 science fiction novels
American science fiction novels
Tor Books books